Petros Xanthopoulos (born 2 September 1959) is a Greek retired football defender.

During his club career, Xanthopoulos played for Olympiacos, Ethnikos Piraeus, Panionios and Proodeftiki. He also amassed 21 caps for the Greece national team.

External links
 
 
 

1959 births
Living people
Greece international footballers
Association football defenders
Olympiacos F.C. players
Ethnikos Piraeus F.C. players
Panionios F.C. players
Proodeftiki F.C. players
Greek football managers
Panargiakos F.C. managers
Chalkidona F.C. managers
Panegialios F.C. managers
Fostiras F.C. managers
Vyzas F.C. managers
Footballers from Athens
Greek footballers